The Federal Signal 3T22 / 2T22 was a dual tone, mechanical outdoor warning siren made by Federal Signal Corporation (formerly Federal Sign and Signal Corporation) from 1952 through the early 1990s. It has a very recognizable design, having a ten-port rotor (chopper) on the bottom with ten cones (horns) and a 12-port one on top with twelve cones.

History
The Federal Signal 3T22 was originally designed as the 2T22 in 1952 or 1954. The 2T22 had the same number of ports and cones. It could produce two main signals (it could produce more but the other signals were rarely used), hence the name "2T22" (the 2 at front representing the 2 choppers, and the 22 representing the amount of horns). The siren had no solenoids, so it could not perform a "hi-lo" signal. In 1955, Federal designed the 3T22, which was similar, except for its name and that it had solenoids. The 3T22 was superior in design because it could perform the "hi-lo" signal, which is mainly used for fire calls. The 2T22 and 3T22 could produce 113db (measured 100 feet away from the siren). There are four models of this type of siren. the 2T22 A and B and the 3T22 A and B. In the name 3T22, the 3 stands for its three main signals: attack (wail), alert (steady), and hi-lo, and the 22 again stands for the twenty-two cones. The A or B determined whether the motor was three phase or single phase. A 3T22A would be three phase, while a 3T22B would be single phase. The siren was mainly used for air raid warnings during the Cold War era and weather warnings after the war. In the early 1990s, the siren's production was stopped when it was replaced with the newer 2001-SRN, which could reach 126db (also measured 100 feet away), hence the name. Like many other older siren models, these sirens are becoming more uncommon due to their age and because of newer technology.

Design
The 3T22 came in only one port ratio: 10/12. It had ten ports and cones on the bottom and twelve ports and cones on the top. It also had a smaller cone on top to reduce rain and other water-related substances such as snow from getting inside. It had two solenoid boxes, one on top, and one on the bottom. There were also two air intake spots: also one on the top and bottom. The siren had a small stand with three legs so it could be mounted on a pole or roof. The stand could be removed and the siren could be mounted differently.

Cities with 3T22s or 2T22s 
 Lewistown, Missouri - 3T22-B, Inactive 
 Bernie, Missouri - 2T22’s Tested Every Saturday at Noon
 Hannibal, Missouri - 2T22’s and 3T22’s
 Centralia, Pennsylvania - 3T22 (probably abandoned)
 Moore, Oklahoma - 2T22 
 Camden, Arkansas - 2T22
 Corsicana, Texas - 2T22s (all installed on November 22, 1979, only one was replaced with an Eclipse 8 after the pole was damaged by a drunk driver)
 La Grange, Kentucky - 3T22
 Kearney, Nebraska - 2T22A
 Germantown, Kentucky - 2T22
 Shelbyville, Indiana - 3T22
 Mechanicsville, Iowa - 3T22
 Dyersville, Iowa - 3T22
 Clyde, Ohio - 3T22 (wired so the dampers shut when the siren winds up and open when it winds down)
 Jacksboro, Texas - 2T22
 Clarks Hill, Indiana - 2T22
 Mountain Lake, Minnesota - 3T22
 Boiling Springs, South Carolina - 3T22
 Lafayette, Indiana - 2T22
 Pottsboro, Texas - 2T22s
 Denver, Pennsylvania - 2T22 (replaced by an Eclipse 8)
 Mount Vernon, Missouri - 2T22s
 Bethany, Oklahoma - 3T22
 Geary, Oklahoma - 2T22
 Frederick, Oklahoma - 2T22
 Hooker, Oklahoma - 2T22
 Sandy, Oregon - 3T22 (pictured above; this siren was later removed from its original location and fully restored to like-new conditions and hung from the ceiling in the entrance to station)
 Clay, Kentucky - 3T22
 Kennedyville, Maryland - 3T22
 Rockwood, Pennsylvania - 3T22A (custom upper intake dome)
 Confluence, Pennsylvania - 3T22
 Shanksville, Pennsylvania - 3T22 (platform pole-mounted) (Replaced with an Eclipse 8 on an unknown date)
 Wisconsin Dells, Wisconsin - 2T22
 Walton, Indiana - 2T22
 Madison, Wisconsin - 2T22 and 3T22s
 Arena, Wisconsin - 3T22
 Cross Plains, Wisconsin - 3T22
 Vincennes, Indiana - 2T22
 Emmitsburg, Maryland - 3T22 (Installed in 1991, 2 lower horns lost in the late 90s-early 2000s, but 2 new horns were added during restoration, restored in bright yellow paint)
 Thurmont, Maryland - 3T22 (used as a fire siren, which sits next to a Model 5) 
 Civietown, North Carolina - 3T22
 Oakley, Kansas - 3T22
 Manly, Iowa - 3T22 (replaced by ASC T121 in the 2010s)
 Ogden Dunes, Indiana - 2T22 (formerly tests every Saturday at noon but sat next to an ASC T-128)
 Grand Rapids, Ohio - 3T22
 Roosevelt, Utah - 3T22 (installed on October 15, 1970)
 Bonham, Texas - 2T22 (installed in 1982)
 Perryville, Kentucky - 2T22
 Punxsutawney, Pennsylvania - 3T22
 Mogadore, Ohio - 3T22 (Fire Siren)
 Caldwell, Ohio - 2T22
 Nova, Ohio - 3T22
 Sullivan, Ohio - 3T22
 Miamisburg, Ohio - 2T22 (inactive)
 Russiaville, Indiana - 2T22
 Clinton, Maryland - 3T22 (formerly part of Washington, District of Columbia's system)
 Fort Washington, Maryland - 3T22 (formerly part of Washington, District of Columbia's system)
 Genesee Township, Michigan - 3T22
 Charlevoix, Michigan - 3T22 (tests every day at noon, also sounds every night at 9:30pm)
 St. Leon, Indiana - 3T22
 Postville, Iowa - 3T22
 Garner, North Carolina - 2T22 or 3T22
 Raeford, North Carolina - 3T22
 Mooreland, Oklahoma - 2T22
 Fort Supply, Oklahoma - 2T22
 Charleston, West Virginia - 2T22
 Zilwaukee, Michigan - 2T22
 Danville, Virginia - 2T22
 Atchison, Kansas - 3T22 (installed on October 23, 1977, a nearby Thunderbolt siren was installed in the city around that same day)
 Macedonia, South Carolina - 2T22
 Middle Island, New York - 3T22
 Frankenmuth, Michigan - 3T22
 Morganfield, Kentucky - 2T22 and 3T22 (does hi-lo) (both sirens removed)
 Clarks Hill, Indiana - 2T22
 Monroe, Wisconsin - 3T22
 Rhine, Georgia - 2T22
 Smiths Station, Alabama - 3T22
 Beulah, Alabama - 3T22 (unsure if it still activates since it was sat next to a 2001 siren a building away)
 Auburn, Alabama - 3T22 
 Pontiac, Illinois - 2T22
 Atlanta, Illinois - 2T22
 Waukegan, Illinois - 2T22s (five of them, all being replaced by 2001-130s, with one 2T22 being under private ownership)
 Salem, Alabama - 3T22 (out of service)
 New Haven, Indiana - 2T22
 Grover, North Carolina - 3T22
 Tyner, North Carolina - 3T22
 Salisbury, North Carolina - 2T22
 Bristol, Tennessee - 2T22 (owns both phases)
 Ware Shoals, South Carolina - 3T22
 Gray Court, South Carolina - 3T22
 Laurens, South Carolina - 3T22
 Renno, South Carolina - 3T22 (Very sick siren, probably is the motor or electrical connection) 
 St. Phillips, South Carolina - 3T22 (Has blocked intake, 12 port)
 Clinton, South Carolina - 3T22
 Tamaqua, Pennsylvania - 3T22
 Greensburg, Pennsylvania - 3T22
 Wheatcroft, Kentucky - 3T22
 La Porte, Indiana - 2T22 (formerly located at Stone Lake, but the siren was not too far from LaPorte County.) 
 Springville, Indiana - Not known model, but listed as part of La Porte's system despite it being located far north of La Porte.
 Savannah, Georgia - 2T22 (Removed)
 Harrison, Nebraska - 3T22
 Albany, Kentucky - 3T22
 Brownsville, Tennessee - 3T22
 Hampton, Nebraska - 2T22
 Falls City, Nebraska - 3T22
 Mardela Springs, Maryland - 3T22
 Newcastle, Wyoming - 2T22
 Mount Ayr, Iowa - Unknown model
 Cannelton, Indiana - 3T22
 Tell City, Indiana - 3T22
 Poole, Kentucky - 3T22
 Eubank, Kentucky - 3T22
 Somerset, Kentucky - 3T22
 Boxville, Kentucky - 3T22 (part of Poole's system but was located near it)
 Ortonville, Michigan - 3T22
 Green River, Utah - 2T22 (installed on March 25, 1976)
 Honolulu, Hawaii - 2T22
 Grand Rapids, Ohio - 3T22
 Russell, Kansas - 2T22, 3T22
 Parsippany-Troy Hills, New Jersey - 3T22 (unknown if still works, located at Parsippany-Troy Hills Fire Department, good condition)
 Lakota, North Dakota - 3T22
 Mohall, ND - Unknown model, replaced by 2001-130 when new fire station was built
 Dixon, Kentucky - 3T22
 Plentywood, Montana - 3T22
 Hazen, North Dakota - 3T22
 Tea, South Dakota - 3T22
 Newhall, Iowa - 3T22
 Halliday, North Dakota - 3T22
 Turtle Lake, North Dakota - 3T22
 East Williston, New York - 3T22 (removed around 2005–2009)
 Breckinridge Center, Kentucky - 3T22
 Kimball, Nebraska - 2T22
 Zap, North Dakota - 3T22
 Lake Ronkonkoma, New York - 3T22 
 Ellwood City, Pennsylvania - 3T22
 Durham, North Carolina - 3T22
 North Baltimore, Ohio - 3T22
 Sandy Springs, South Carolina - 3T22 (Damper stuck complete on 12 port tone, co-mounted with the STL-10 siren)
 Walbridge, Ohio - 3T22
 Hawkinsville, Georgia - 3T22
 Dillon, Montana - 3T22
 Woodward, Oklahoma - 2T22
 Drumright, Oklahoma - 2T22
 Thomas, Oklahoma - 2T22
 El Reno, Oklahoma - 2T22 (survived during the 3 El Reno tornadoes)
 Shopiere, Wisconsin - 3T22
 Wellston, Oklahoma - 2T22
 Rugby, North Dakota - 2T22, 3T22
 Dunn Center, North Dakota - 2T22
 Thedford, Nebraska - 2T22
 Bassett, Nebraska - 2T22
 LaGrange, Kentucky - 2T22, 3T22
 Atkinson, Nebraska - 2T22
 Mayfield, Kentucky - 3T22 (survived from the December 2021 Midwest Tornado Outbreak).
 Cannelton, Indiana - 3T22
 Arapaho, Oklahoma - 2T22
 Chandler, Oklahoma - 2T22
 Okeene, Oklahoma - 2T22
 Guymon, Oklahoma - 2T22
 New Haven, Kentucky - 3T22
 Bayard, Nebraska - 2T22
 Holton, Kansas - 3T22
 Amarillo, Texas - 2T22
 Millhousen, Indiana - 3T22
 Park Forest, Illinois - 3T22 (All 3 Removed In July 2021)
 Mound City, Illinois - 3T22
 Anna, Illinois - 3T22
 Sonora, Kentucky - 3T22
 Hebron, North Dakota - 3T22
 Hillsboro, North Dakota - 2T22
 Salmon, Idaho - 3T22
 Roundup, Montana - 3T22
 Garrison, North Dakota - 3T22
 Bottineau, North Dakota - 3T22
 Centerville, Indiana - 2T22
 Ames, Iowa - 2T22
 Waynesboro, Tennessee - 3T22
 Vernon, Connecticut - 3T22 (Removed)
 Beulah, North Dakota - 3T22
 Devils Lake, North Dakota - 3T22
 Wichita, Kansas - 2T22
 Velva, North Dakota - 3T22
 Bowman, North Dakota - 3T22
 Lancaster, Kentucky - 3T22
 McCook, Nebraska - 2T22
 Boys Town, Nebraska - 2T22
 Harrodsburg, Kentucky - 3T22
 Edinboro, Pennsylvania - 3T22
 Mt. Washington, Kentucky - 2T22
 La Platte, Nebraska - 3T22
 Bolivar, West Virginia - 3T22
 Fenton, Missouri - 3T22
 Brooklyn, Wisconsin - 2T22
 Perrysburg, Ohio - 2T22
 Silvis, Illinois - 3T22
 Accord, New York - 3T22
 Colby, Kansas - 3T22
 Louisville, Kentucky - 2T22 and 3T22
 Reedsburg, Wisconsin - 3T22
 South Glens Falls, New York - 3T22
 West Fort Ann, New York - 3T22
 Fayetteville, New York - 3T22 (This 3T22 went out of service in 2005 and is still standing today, waiting to be taken down in the next year or two.
 Saratoga Springs, New York - 3T22 (Located in the infield at the Saratoga Race Course)
 North Baltimore, Ohio - 2T22
 Bridgeport, Pennsylvania - 3T22 (Located at Bridgeport FD but sounds in attack for fire calls)
 Alburnett, Iowa - 2T22 (12pm & 6pm whistles, and tornado warnings, extremely healthy)
 Port Jefferson, New York - 2T22
 Yaphank, New York - 3T22
 East Islip, New York - 3T22
 Islip (hamlet), New York - 3T22 (Replaced with Modulator in 2010)
 Middle Island, New York - 3T22
 Stratford, Texas - 2T22
 Strausstown, Pennsylvania - 2T22 (Blocked top intake and enclosed in a tower)
 Setauket, New York - 3T22 (Replaced with Eclipse 8 in 2018)
 Waterford, New York- 3T22
 Salem, Georgia - 2T22A
 Sulphur Springs, Texas - 2T22
 Morganfield, Kentucky - 3T22
 Hollywood, Alabama - 2T22
 Algonquin, Illinois - 2T22
 Hebron, Illinois - 2T22 (installed in 2008–09)
 Clarendon, Arkansas - 3T22
 Williamsburg, Iowa - 3T22 (installed on May 4, 1977)
 Vernon, California - 2T22 (inactive)
 Cambria, Wisconsin - 3T22 (Active, Patriotic, sounds twice per day, 12 and 6, extremely well kept)
 Island Lake, Illinois - 3T22
 Lake Crystal, Minnesota - 3T22
 Providence, Kentucky - 3T22
 Mascoutah, Illinois - 3T22 (Two, possibly three active (very healthy), tested first Tuesday of each month at 10:00 am)
 Arlington, Kansas - 3T22 (tested first Tuesday of every month)
 Belton, Texas - Not known model (also not known if it is removed or still working)
 Valley Springs, South Dakota - 3T22 (Removed in 2008) 
 Bloomington, Illinois - 2T22
 LaPorte, Indiana - 2T22
 Mapleton, Utah - 3T22 (Tests every day at noon, lower damper removed, missing two horns)
 Startex, South Carolina - 2T22
 Luckey, Ohio - 3T22
 Ridgely, Maryland - 3T22
 Snow Hill, Maryland - 3T22
 Bunceton, Missouri - 2T22
 Slaughters, Kentucky - 3T22
 Odessa, Missouri - 2T22
 Lewistown, Maryland - 3T22
 Suffield, Connecticut - 3T22
 Gaston, Oregon - 3T22 (Missing lower row of horns, restored and remounted in October 2021)
 Mt. Angel, Oregon - 3T22 (Restored and reinstalled on ground in front of entrance to fire station)
 Tooele, Utah - 3T22 (Removed)
 Stansbury, Utah - 3T22 (Removed)
 Lake Point, Utah - 3T22 (Removed, replaced by Whelen 2810)
 St. Meinrad, Indiana - 3T22
 Hoover, Alabama - 2T22 (Removed)
 Mulga, Alabama - 2T22 (Removed, replaced by 2001-130)
 The Village, Oklahoma - 2T22
 Dumas, Texas - 2T22
 Stacyville, Iowa - 2T22
 Bayport, Minnesota - 2T22
 Sheldahl, Iowa - 3T22
 Womelsdorf, Pennsylvania - 3T22
 Richland Center, Wisconsin - 3T22
 Evansville, Wisconsin - 3T22
 Joanna, South Carolina - 3T22
 Butler, New Jersey - 3T22
 Ankeny, Iowa - 2T22
 Rochelle, Illinois - 2T22
 Roeland Park, Kansas - 2T22
 Manito, Illinois - 2T22
 Amherst, Massachusetts - 2T22 (Defunct)
 Bellevue, Nebraska - 2T22
 West Lafayette, Indiana - 2T22
 Okemah, Oklahoma - 3T22 (imported from Stillwater's system)
 Boise City, Oklahoma - 3T22
 Shattuck, Oklahoma - 3T22
 Duncan, Oklahoma - 2T22
 Tyrone, Oklahoma - 2T22
 Arnett, Oklahoma - 2T22
 Braman, Oklahoma - 2T22
 Hennessey, Oklahoma - 2T22
 Braman, Oklahoma - 2T22
 Paoli, Oklahoma - 2T22
 Gene Autry, Oklahoma - 2T22
 Davenport, Oklahoma - 2T22
 Roff, Oklahoma - 2T22
 Wilson, Oklahoma - 2T22
 Wynnewood, Oklahoma - 2T22
 Welch, Oklahoma - 2T22
 Lucien, Oklahoma - 2T22
 Morrison, Oklahoma - 2T22
 Fairland, Oklahoma - 2T22
 Glencoe, Oklahoma  - 2T22
 Skiatook, Oklahoma - 2T22
 Rattan, Oklahoma - 3T22 (Unknown If Still in Service)
 Durant, Mississippi - 3T22
 Roxie, Mississippi - 3T22
 Meridian, Mississippi - 2T22
 Coats, North Carolina - 2T22
 Lillington, North Carolina - 2T22
 Shannon, North Carolina - 2T22
 Bunnlevel, North Carolina - 2T22
 Concord, North Carolina - 2T22
 Faith, North Carolina - 2T22
 Gold Hill, North Carolina - 2T22
 Glade Spring, Virginia - 2T22
 Burgin, Kentucky - 3T22
 Perrysville, Ohio - 3T22
 Denton, Texas - 3T22
 Three Rivers, Michigan - 3T22
 Lamar, Missouri - 3T22
 Pewee Valley, Kentucky - 3T22
 McCord Bend, Missouri - 2T22 (installed on September 25, 2020)
 La Vista, Nebraska - 3T22
 Barry, Illinois - 2T22
 Patterson Springs, North Carolina - 2T22
 Edmond, Oklahoma - 2T22
 Conneaut Lake, Pennsylvania - 3T22
 Roundup, Montana - 3T22
 Dane, Wisconsin - 3T22
 Brooklyn, Wisconsin - 2T22
 Stanwood, Washington - 2T22
 Spearman, Texas - 2T22 and 3T22
 Higgins, Texas - 3T22
 Post, Texas - 2T22 and 3T22
 Ballinger, Texas - 3T22
 Olney, Texas - 3T22
 Archer City, Texas - 3T22
 Sadler, Texas - 2T22
 Killeen, Texas - 3T22
 Scotland, Texas - 3T22 
 Chico, Texas - 3T22
 Longview, Texas - 3T22 (only Federal Signal siren that was used in the area's Eastman Chemical Company plant, it sat not too far away from a dozen Whelen 2803s and the only active Sentry 5V at the plant)
 Hearne, Texas - 2T22
 Richardson, Texas - 2T22 (not activatable, most sat next to an ASC T-128, one inactivated since 2002)
 Arlington, Minnesota - 3T22
 Keene, Texas - 2T22 (one possibly not activable, and the other dead which sits next to an ASC T-135)
 Ford, Kansas - 3T22
 Sulphur Springs, Texas - 2T22
 Fowler, Kansas - 3T22
 Big Spring, Texas - 2T22 (one was installed on May 11, 1971, as a manually activated siren until 1986)
 Christoval, Texas - 2T22 (part of San Angelo's system)(Inactive)
 Offerle, Kansas - 2T22 
 Fritch, Texas - 2T22
 Holliday, Texas - 2T22
 Effingham, Kansas - 2T22
 McLean, Texas - 2T22
 Iowa Park, Texas - 2T22
 Rio Vista, Texas - 2T22
 Farwell, Texas - 2T22 (sat next to a Sentry 16V1T-B)
 Crowell, Texas - 2T22
 Floydada, Texas - 2T22
 Miami, Texas - 2T22
 Dalhart, Texas - 2T22
 Edgerton, Minnesota - 2T22
 Fulda, Minnesota - 2T22
 Ironton, Minnesota - 2T22
 Keewatin, Minnesota - 2T22
 Nocona Hills, Texas - 2T22
 Anton, Texas - 2T22
 Holton, Kansas - 2T22 
 Strawn, Texas - 2T22
 Canyon, Texas - 2T22
 Kermit, Texas - 2T22s (Two of them)
 Topeka, Kansas - 2T22
 Hoyt, Kansas - 2T22 (Privately owned, replaced by a 2001-130)
 Mayetta, Kansas - 2T22 (Visible in a private property, replaced by a 2001-130)
 Ulysses, Kansas - 2T22
 Worthington, Minnesota - 2T22
 Twin Valley, Minnesota - 2T22
 Minnesota City, Minnesota - 2T22
 Mankato, Minnesota - 2T22 (inactive)
 Lismore, Minnesota - 2T22
 Breckenridge, Minnesota - 2T22
 St. Cloud, Minnesota - 2T22
 Tracy, Minnesota - 2T22
 Crystal, Minnesota - 2T22
 Nashwauk, Minnesota - 2T22
 Lakeville, Minnesota - 2T22
 Lewiston, Minnesota - 2T22
 Beaver Creek, Minnesota - 3T22
 Babbitt, Minnesota - 3T22
 Brewster, Minnesota - 3T22
 Canby, Minnesota - 3T22
 Zumbrota, Minnesota - 3T22s (one replaced by an Eclipse 8 after being struck by lightning)
 International Falls, Minnesota - 3T22
 Brainerd, Minnesota - 3T22
 Hills, Minnesota - 3T22
 Eagle Lake, Minnesota - 3T22
 Ellsworth, Minnesota - 3T22
 Glyndon, Minnesota - 3T22
 Gaylord, Minnesota - 3T22
 Wheaton, Minnesota - 3T22
 Thief River Falls, Minnesota - 3T22
 Ocean City, Maryland - 3T22 (located a mile away from the Delaware/Maryland border)
 Frederick, Maryland - 3T22
 Lincroft, New Jersey - 3T22
 David City, Nebraska - 3T22s (several were replaced with Federal Signal 2001-130 sirens in recent years. One 3T22 is still installed in its original location, but may not be in service)
 Ulysses, Nebraska - 3T22
 Wailea, Hawaii - 2T22 (possible activation or disconnection, due to failed operation)
 Emden, Illinois - 2T22
 Larned, Kansas - 2T22
 Pontiac, Illinois - 2T22
 Fountain Inn, South Carolina - 3T22
 Murdo, South Dakota - 3T22
 Piedmont, South Dakota - 3T22
 Hot Springs, South Dakota - 3T22 
 Sturgis, South Dakota - 3T22
 Pukwana, South Dakota - 3T22s (one replaced with a Whelen Vortex)
 Plankinton, South Dakota - 3T22
 Blunt, South Dakota - 3T22
 Eagle Butte, South Dakota - 2T22
 Selby, South Dakota - 3T22 (Indirectly replaced by a 2001-SRNB a few blocks away, but still used for testing)
 Herreid, South Dakota - 3T22 (Unknown status. An American Signal Corporation E-Class EC-4 sits next to it.)
 Mobridge, South Dakota - 3T22 (Unknown status)
 Harrisburg, South Dakota - 2T22
 Flandreau, South Dakota - 2T22
 Chester, South Dakota - 2T22
 Alcester, South Dakota - 2T22
 Woonsocket, South Dakota - 3T22
 Ault, Colorado - 3T22
 Collinsburg, Pennsylvania - 3T22
 Galva, Illinois - 2T22
 Murdo, South Dakota - 2T22
 Trafford, Pennsylvania - 3T22
 California, Maryland - 2T22
 Brunswick, Maryland - 2T22
 Snow Hill, Maryland - 2T22s (one replace with Eclipse 8)
 Indian Head, Maryland - 3T22
 Buckner, Kentucky - 3T22
 Cocoa, Florida - 3T22
 Astatula, Florida - 3T22
 Avon Park, Florida - 3T22
 Allen, Texas - 2T22 (removed sometime in August 2004)
 Phillipsburg, Missouri - 2T22
 Bourbon, Missouri - 3T22 (removed, replaced by an American Signal E-Class EC-4)
 Fairbank, Iowa - 3T22
 Paia, Hawaii - 2T22
 Kihei, Hawaii - 2T22s
 Kaunakakai, Hawaii - 2T22 (far western portion of the town)
 Mabalacat, Pampanga, Philippines - 2T22 (located at Clark Airbase)
 Sullom Voe, Shetland Islands, United Kingdom - 3T22  (More than one, but only one is visible from Google Street View; located at the entrance to the Sullom Voe Terminal)
 Manchester, Michigan - 2T22
 Fordyce, Nebraska - 3T22
 Bowie, Maryland 3T22
 Linton, North Dakota - 3T22
 Franklin, North Carolina - 3T22
 Bella Vista, Arkansas - 2T22 (inactive)
 Imboden, Arkansas - 2T22
 Viola, Arkansas - 2T22
 Lakeview, Arkansas - 2T22
 Marshall, Arkansas - 2T22 and 3T22
 Calico Rock, Arkansas - 2T22
 Greers Ferry, Arkansas - 2T22
 Blytheville, Arkansas - 2T22 (located on top of the Cache Valley Electric building and plant)
 Lepanto, Arkansas - 2T22
 Quitman, Arkansas - 2T22

In Popular Culture 
Like other sirens (such as the Federal Signal Thunderbolt and the STH-10), the 2T22 and/or 3T22 are commonly used as a sound effect in films, videos, and songs. The sound effect itself can even be used to alert others.

References

http://civildefensemuseum.com/sirens/manuals/255A152H-2T22-3T22.pdf

External links
 https://federalsignal.com/
 Hear a 2T22 in alert mode
 Hear a 2T22 in attack mode
 Hear a 3T22 in alert mode
 Hear a 3T22 in attack mode
 Hear a 3T22 in hi-lo mode
 2T22 picture
 3T22 picture

Sirens
Disaster preparedness
Civil defense
Emergency population warning systems